The following is a list of cities by sunshine duration. Sunshine duration is a climatological indicator, measuring duration of sunshine in given period (usually, a day or a year) for a given location on Earth, typically expressed as an averaged value over several years. It is a general indicator of cloudiness of a location, and thus differs from insolation, which measures the total energy delivered by sunlight over a given period.

Sunshine duration is usually expressed in hours per year, or in (average) hours per day. The first measure indicates the general sunniness of a location compared with other places, while the latter allows for comparison of sunshine in various seasons in the same location. Another often-used measure is percentage ratio of recorded bright sunshine duration and daylight duration in the observed period.

Africa

Asia

Europe

North America

South America

Oceania

See also 
 List of cities by average temperature

References

Sunshine duration
Sunshine duration, cities
Climate and weather statistics